Clowne & Barlborough is a former railway station in Clowne northeast of Chesterfield, Derbyshire, England.

Context
The station was built by the Midland Railway at the summit of the circuitous  to  line known as the Clowne Branch.

History
The station was opened without ceremony on 1 November 1888 as "Clown".

The line was single track between Seymour Junction and Elmton and Creswell. Remarkably, the station survived into the 21st Century, being demolished in 2000.

On 4 July 1938 the station was renamed "Clown and Barlborough", then renamed again by British Railways (BR) on 18 June 1951, this time by adding a "e" to become "Clowne and Barlborough." BR went to this trouble to seek to distinguish the station from its neighbour, a mere 30 yards to the south, the ex-LD&ECR station which it renamed .

Passenger services
Passenger services commenced on 1 November 1888. Initially the service of three trains each way, with a market day extra on Wednesdays and a Saturday evening extra, eastbound only. No service was ever provided on Sundays. A common thread between these stations is that every one of them was subsequently renamed at least once or, in the case of Whittington, relocated. The time taken for this sinuous  journey was about an hour.

By 1922 five trains a day, Monday to Saturday, plied the route,  but this was the high-water mark. By 1952 only one train each way, Monday to Friday, served Clowne and Barlborough, timed to suit schools. It ran eastwards from Chesterfield in the morning as far as Elmton and Creswell, but was extended, unadvertised, to Shirebrook West during term time. This was reversed in the afternoons, starting unadvertised from Shirebrook West during term time, and from Elmton and Creswell on the public timetable. That service was withdrawn on 5 July 1954; the last train was operated, remarkably, by a brand new DMU.

That called for the last time northbound on 11 August 1962, returning southbound the following Saturday.

The last steam train to use the line was a non-stop enthusiasts' special on 16 October 1965. This train also traversed the Doe Lea Branch.

Freight
Light engine movements and intermittent freight trains continued over the Clowne Branch until the early 1990s when an underground fire threatened to undermine the line, compounded by the expensive need to replace the points connecting the branch to what is now known as the Robin Hood Line at Elmton and Creswell. These points were replaced by plain line, as were those at Oxcroft Colliery Junction. Superb images of the area are available on line but note that, as the aerial view on the site shows, "Oxcroft Colliery No 3" signalbox was near Barlborough Colliery, not Oxcroft Colliery.

Present day
The trackbed is now a greenway with the platform of Clowne and Barlborough as well as Clowne South Station visible. The station site forms a greenway between Staveley and Creswell via Clowne.

References

Sources

External links
Clowne and Barlborough railway station on navigable 1947 O.S. Map npe Maps
Both Clowne stations on multiple maps National Library of Scotland
The station and line with mileages Railway Codes

Disused railway stations in Derbyshire
Former Midland Railway stations
Railway stations in Great Britain opened in 1888
Railway stations in Great Britain closed in 1954